
Native reserve or Reserve may refer to:

Places

Australia
 Aboriginal reserve
 Indigenous Protected Area

Canada
 Urban Indian reserve/Réserve indienne urbaine
 Indian reserve

New Zealand
 Native Reserves, areas formerly designated for Māori people 
 (see also Te Puni Kōkiri (Ministry of Māori Development))

South Africa
 Bantustans, originally created  as native reserves by the British government

United States
 Hawaiian home land
 Indian reservation
 Indian colony
 List of Alaska Native tribal entities

See also 
 Homeland
 Apartheid in South Africa